Busbiina is a genus of Neotropical butterfly in the family Lycaenidae. Its sole species, Busbiina bosora, is known from Ecuador.

References

Eumaeini
Lycaenidae of South America
Monotypic butterfly genera
Lycaenidae genera